The Cinema One Originals Film Festival, a division of ABS-CBN Films commonly known as Cinema One Originals, is an independent film festival in the Philippines held annually in the month of November in Quezon City. Its primary goal is to showcase the diverse talent and voices of Filipino film makers. The film festival is produced by Cinema One, a cable television network owned by ABS-CBN Corporation.

The film entries are split into two categories, Plus and Currents, based on the films' marketability. From the scripts submitted to the screening committee, five films are granted two million pesos each for the Cinema One Plus category while ten films are granted one million pesos each for the Cinema One Currents category. The selection is based on the quality of scripts and presentation of the film makers.

2005 Cinema One Originals Film Festival
The film festival ran from July 29–31, 2005. The following films selected for 2005 Competition:

2006 Cinema One Originals Film Festival
The film festival ran from November 24–26, 2006. The following films selected for 2006 Competition:

2007 Cinema One Originals Film Festival
The film festival ran from November 30 – December 2, 2007. The following films selected for 2007 Competition:

2008 Cinema One Originals Film Festival
The film festival ran from December 3–10, 2008. The following films selected for 2008 Competition:

2009 Cinema One Originals Film Festival
The film festival ran from November 13–17, 2009. The following films selected for 2009 Competition:

2010 Cinema One Originals Film Festival
The film festival ran from November 10–16, 2010. The following films selected for 2010 Competition:

2011 Cinema One Originals Film Festival
The film festival ran from November 9–15, 2011. The following films selected for 2011 Competition:

2012 Cinema One Originals Film Festival
The film festival ran from November 28 – December 9, 2012.

Plus Category
The following films contending for 2012 Plus Category:

Currents Category
The following films contending for 2012 Currents Category:

2013 Cinema One Originals Film Festival
The film festival ran from November 11–19, 2013.

Plus Category
The following films contending for 2013 Plus Category:

Currents Category
The following films contending for 2013 Currents Category:

2014 Cinema One Originals Film Festival
The film festival ran from November 9 to 18, 2014. There is only one category for 2014. Ten full-length feature films competed this year. (There were also screenings for six short films, five restored classics, and seven Asian films.) The following are the contending films:

2015 Cinema One Originals Film Festival
The film festival ran from November 9 to 17, 2015. There are nine films in competition for this year, which had the tagline "Kakaiba Ka Ba?" There were also screenings for two special presentation films, four Filipino classics, 10 short films, and 12 foreign films.

2016 Cinema One Originals Film Festival 
The film festival ran from November 14 to 22, 2016. There are ten films in competition for this year, which had the tagline "Anong tingin mo?" The competition also opened itself to documentaries.

Documentary Feature Category

Narrative Feature Category

2017 Cinema One Originals Film Festival 
The film festival ran from November 13 to 28, 2017. There are nine films in competition for this year, which had the tagline "Walang takot!" The competition also opened itself to documentaries.

Documentary Feature Category

Narrative Feature Category

2018 Cinema One Originals Film Festival 
The film festival ran from October 12 to 21, 2018. There are nine films in competition for this year, which had the tagline "I Am Original", encompassing the theme of what it truly means to be human. The competition also opened itself to short films.

Short Films Feature Category

Narrative Feature Category

 * Never Tear Us Apart and Paglisan were tied in the said award.

2019 Cinema One Originals Film Festival 
The film festival ran from November 7 to 17, 2019. There are eight films in this year competition, which had the tagline "I Am Original, Kaya Mo?".

Best Short Film
 Sa Among Agwat by Don Senoc

Student Film Award
 Kapasidad by Tyrone James Luanzon

Narrative Feature Category

 * Lucid and O were tied from the Best Musical Score
 ** Metamorphosis and  Tia Madre were tied from Best Cinematography

References

External links

Podcast: Cinema One Originals Festival 2014 Press Con
Podcast: Cinema One Originals 2015 Press Con

Film festivals in the Philippines
Events in Metro Manila
ABS-CBN